Evansville is a census-designated place (CDP) in Yukon-Koyukuk Census Area, Alaska, United States. The population was 15 at the 2010 census, down from 28 in 2000. The community is adjacent to Bettles. The community is named after Wilford Evans, Sr, who took part in the founding of Bettles Lodge.

Geography
Evansville is located on the southeast bank of the Koyukuk River at  (66.902950, -151.499190). The community is on the former Hickel Highway, that now connects to the Dalton Highway as a winter ice road only and crosses the Jim River.

Climate
As with much of Interior Alaska, Evansville experiences a subarctic climate (Köppen Dfc) with very long, frigid winters and short, warm summers, and is located in USDA Plant Hardiness Zone 1, indicating the coldest temperature of the year is typically at or below . The first frost of the season usually begins in late August, but sometimes it can happen during the first half of that month. A majority of the annual precipitation of  occurs during summer as well.

Notes

Demographics

Evansville first appeared on the 1970 U.S. Census as an unincorporated village. In 1980, it was made a census-designated place (CDP).

As of the census of 2000, there were 28 people, 12 households, and 6 families residing in the CDP. The population density was 1.3 people per square mile (0.5/km2). There were 30 housing units at an average density of 1.4/sq mi (0.5/km2). The racial makeup of the CDP was 46.43% White, 50.00% Native American, and 3.57% from two or more races.

There were 12 households, out of which 25.0% had children under the age of 18 living with them, 41.7% were married couples living together, 8.3% had a female householder with no husband present, and 50.0% were non-families. 33.3% of all households were made up of individuals, and 16.7% had someone living alone who was 65 years of age or older. The average household size was 2.33 and the average family size was 3.33.

In the CDP, the population was spread out, with 28.6% under the age of 18, 7.1% from 18 to 24, 25.0% from 25 to 44, 14.3% from 45 to 64, and 25.0% who were 65 years of age or older. The median age was 34 years. For every 100 females, there were 115.4 males. For every 100 females age 18 and over, there were 100.0 males.

The median income for a household in the CDP was $53,750, and the median income for a family was $54,583. Males had a median income of $30,833 versus $0 for females. The per capita income for the CDP was $15,746. There were no families and 4.3% of the population living below the poverty line, including no under eighteens and none of those over 64.

Transportation
Bettles Airport's commercial and freight airline service is provided by Wright Air Service, with daily service to and from Fairbanks and other communities. The Vor Lake Waterlane seaplane base is located in the community.

Education
The community was previously served by the Bettles Field School of the Yukon–Koyukuk School District. The school, however was closed in the 2002-03 school year due to insufficient enrollment.

References

Census-designated places in Alaska
Census-designated places in Unorganized Borough, Alaska
Census-designated places in Yukon–Koyukuk Census Area, Alaska
Populated places of the Arctic United States